Ezra Townsend Cresson, also Ezra Townsend senior (18 June 1838, in Byberry – 19 April 1926, in Swarthmore) was an American entomologist who specialised in the Hymenoptera order of insects. He wrote Synopsis of the families and genera of the Hymenoptera of America, north of Mexico Philadelphia: Paul C. Stockhausen, Entomological printer (1887) and many other works. His son Ezra Townsend, Jr. (1876–1948) was also an entomologist but a specialist in Diptera.

Cresson also documented many new species including Nomada texana.

References
Essig, E. O. 1931 A History of Entomology. -New York, Macmillan Company.
Mallis, A. 1971 American Entomologists.  Rutgers Univ. Press New Brunswick 343-348, Portr.
Osborn, H. 1937 Fragments of Entomological History Including Some Personal Recollections of Men and Events.  Columbus, Ohio, Published by the Author.
Osborn, H. 1952 A Brief History of Entomology Including Time of Demosthenes and Aristotle to Modern Times with over Five Hundred Portraits.

External links

Hymenopterists
American entomologists
1838 births
1926 deaths